Michael Lemonick (born 13 October 1953) is an opinion editor at Scientific American, a former senior staff writer at Climate Central and a former senior science writer at Time. He has also written for Discover, Yale Environment 360, Scientific American, and others, and has written a number of popular-level books on science and astrophysics, including The Georgian Star: How William and Caroline Herschel Revolutionized Our Understanding of the Cosmos, Echo of the Big Bang, Other Worlds: The Search For Life in the Universe, and Mirror Earth: The Search for Our Planet's Twin.

Son of Princeton University physics professor and administrator Aaron Lemonick and native of Princeton, New Jersey, Lemonick graduated from Princeton High School, and then earned degrees at Harvard University and the Columbia University Graduate School of Journalism. He teaches communications and journalism at Princeton University. He currently resides in Princeton with his wife Eileen Hohmuth-Lemonick, a photographer and photography instructor at Princeton Day School.

Bibliography

Books
The Light at the Edge of the Universe: Leading Cosmologists on the Brink of a Scientific Revolution (May 11, 1993)
 Other Worlds: The Search for Life in the Universe (May 14, 1998)
 Echo of the Big Bang (2003); 2nd edition (Apr 24, 2005)
 The Georgian Star: How William and Caroline Herschel Revolutionized Our Understanding of the Cosmos (Great Discoveries) (Dec 14, 2009)
 Mirror Earth: The Search for Our Planet's Twin (Oct 29, 2013); 2012 ebook
 The Light at the Edge of the Universe: Dispatches from the Front Lines of Cosmology (Princeton Legacy Library) (July 14, 2014)
 The Perpetual Now: A Story of Amnesia, Memory, and Love (Feb 7, 2017)

Essays and reporting

References

External links
Interview on the Marketing for Scientists blog

 (public lecture by Michael Lemonick, 27 February 2009)
About Michael Lemonick

1953 births
Living people
Columbia University Graduate School of Journalism alumni
Discover (magazine) people
Harvard University alumni
People from Princeton, New Jersey
Princeton High School (New Jersey) alumni
Princeton University faculty
Scientific American people